Stenoptilodes medius is a moth of the family Pterophoridae that is known from Ecuador.

Adults are on wing in October and January.

Etymology
The name indicates that this is the central of three closely related species. The present species occurs in Ecuador, Stenoptilodes thrasydoxa flies to the north, in Colombia, and there is a third species, Stenoptilodes altiaustralis, to the south, in Peru.

External links

medius
Moths described in 2006
Endemic fauna of Ecuador
Moths of South America
Taxa named by Cees Gielis